JWH-249 (1-pentyl-3-(2-bromophenylacetyl)indole) is a synthetic cannabinoid from the phenylacetylindole family, which acts as a cannabinoid agonist with about 2.4 times selectivity for CB1 with a Ki of 8.4 ± 1.8 nM and 20 ± 2 nM at CB2. Similar to the related 2'-methoxy compound JWH-250, the 2'-chloro compound JWH-203, and the 2'-methyl compound JWH-251, JWH-249 has a phenylacetyl group in place of the naphthoyl ring used in most aminoalkylindole cannabinoid compounds.

In the United States, CB1 receptor agonists of the 3-phenylacetylindole class such as cannabipiperidiethanone are Schedule I Controlled Substances.

See also 
 AM-679

References 

JWH cannabinoids
Phenylacetylindoles
Bromoarenes
CB1 receptor agonists
CB2 receptor agonists